Astoria station may refer to:

Transportation
Astoria metro station, a Budapest Metro station
Astoria Boulevard station, a New York City Subway station
Astoria–Ditmars Boulevard station, a New York City Subway station

Other
Coast Guard Air Station Astoria, in Warrenton, Oregon

See also
Astoria (disambiguation)